Denmark participated in the Eurovision Song Contest 2004 with the song "Shame on You" written by Ivar Lind Greiner and Iben Plesner. The song was performed by Tomas Thordarson. The Danish broadcaster DR returned to the Eurovision Song Contest after a one-year absence following their relegation from 2003 as one of the bottom five countries in the 2002 contest. DR organised the national final Dansk Melodi Grand Prix 2004 in order to select the Danish entry for the 2004 contest in Istanbul, Turkey. Ten songs competed in a televised show where "Sig det' løgn" performed by Tomas Thordarson was the winner as decided upon through two rounds of public voting. The song was later translated from Danish to English for the Eurovision Song Contest and was titled "Shame on You".

Denmark competed in the semi-final of the Eurovision Song Contest which took place on 12 May 2004. Performing during the show in position 19, "Shame on You" was not announced among the top 10 entries of the semi-final and therefore did not qualify to compete in the final. It was later revealed that Denmark placed thirteenth out of the 22 participating countries in the semi-final with 56 points.

Background 

Prior to the 2004 contest, Denmark had participated in the Eurovision Song Contest thirty-two times since its first entry in 1957. In the 2002 contest, the nation finished in twenty-fourth (last) place with the song "Tell Me Who You Are" performed by Malene Mortensen.

The Danish national broadcaster, DR, broadcasts the event within Denmark and organises the selection process for the nation's entry. DR confirmed their intentions to participate at the 2004 Eurovision Song Contest on 27 August 2003. Denmark has selected all of their Eurovision entries through the national final Dansk Melodi Grand Prix. Along with their participation confirmation, the broadcaster announced that Dansk Melodi Grand Prix 2004 would be organised in order to select Denmark's entry for the 2004 contest.

Before Eurovision

Dansk Melodi Grand Prix 2004 
Dansk Melodi Grand Prix 2004 was the 34th edition of Dansk Melodi Grand Prix, the music competition that selects Denmark's entries for the Eurovision Song Contest. The event was held on 7 February 2004 at the Atletion in Aarhus, hosted by Natasja Crone and Peter Mygind and televised on DR1. The national final was watched by 1.779 million viewers in Denmark.

Competing entries 
DR opened a submission period between 1 October 2003 and 3 November 2003 for composers to submit their entries. All composers and lyricists were required to be Danish citizens or have Danish residency, while all songs were required to be performed in Danish. The broadcaster received 315 entries during the submission period. A seven-member selection committee selected ten songs from the entries submitted to the broadcaster, while the artists of the selected entries were chosen by DR in consultation with their composers. The competing songs were announced on 22 December 2003 with their artists being announced on 8 January 2004. Among the artists was Helge Engelbrecht (member of Neighbours) who represented Denmark in the Eurovision Song Contest 1987 as part of Bandjo.

Final 
The final took place on 7 February 2004 where the winner was determined over two rounds of public voting. In the first round of voting the top five advanced to the superfinal. In the superfinal, the winner, "Sig det' løgn" performed by Tomas Thordarson, was selected. Viewers were able to vote via telephone or SMS and the telephone voting results of each of Denmark's four regions as well as the SMS voting results in the superfinal were converted to points which were each distributed as follows: 4, 6, 8, 10 and 12 points.

At Eurovision
It was announced that the competition's format would be expanded to include a semi-final in 2004. According to the rules, all nations with the exceptions of the host country, the "Big Four" (France, Germany, Spain and the United Kingdom), and the ten highest placed finishers in the 2003 contest are required to qualify from the semi-final on 12 May 2004 in order to compete for the final on 15 May 2004; the top ten countries from the semi-final progress to the final. On 23 March 2004, a special allocation draw was held which determined the running order for the semi-final and Denmark was set to perform in position 19, following the entry from Croatia and before the entry from Serbia and Montenegro. Tomas Thordarson performed the English version of "Sig det' løgn" at the contest, titled "Shame on You". At the end of the semi-final, Denmark was not announced among the top 10 entries and therefore failed to qualify to compete in the final. It was later revealed that Denmark placed thirteenth in the semi-final, receiving a total of 56 points.

The semi-final and final were broadcast on DR1 with commentary by Jørgen de Mylius. The Danish spokesperson, who announced the Danish votes during the final, was Camilla Ottesen.

Voting 
Below is a breakdown of points awarded to Denmark and awarded by Denmark in the semi-final and grand final of the contest. The nation awarded its 12 points to Bosnia and Herzegovina in the semi-final and to Sweden in the final of the contest.

Points awarded to Denmark

Points awarded by Denmark

References

2004
Countries in the Eurovision Song Contest 2004
Eurovision
Eurovision